The Plainclothesman was the first American police procedural series,  and was broadcast on the DuMont Television Network from October 12, 1949 to September 12, 1954.

Overview
The series ran from 1949 to 1954, and starred Ken Lynch, whose character was known only as "the Lieutenant". The main character's face was never seen on camera (with one exception) as the series used the "point of view shot" technique.  The exception was a July 1952 episode, which featured flashbacks in which Lynch's (and the Lieutenant's) face was shown.

The viewer saw scenes as the Lieutenant did. If he lit a cigar, his hand came toward the camera with a lighted match, and the viewers saw the tip of the cigar at the bottom of their television screen. If the Lieutenant was knocked down, the camera showed the view of looking up from the floor. When his partner, Sergeant Brady, or other characters, talked with the Lieutenant, they looked directly at the camera. 

The opening crime scene was shown in the objective style (not through the Lieutenant’s eyes), as were flashback scenes, where witnesses or suspects narrated what they saw.

Cast
 Ken Lynch as "the Lieutenant"
 Jack Orrison as Sergeant Brady
 Helen Gillette as Annie the Waitress (occasional role)

Production
The program was produced by DuMont, in association with Transamerican, an independent production company.  

Arthur Forrest was a cameraman on the series. He used a camera on a bulky pedestal that was hard to control, but it had a small crane that allowed the camera to show the Lieutenant’s field of vision by focusing in on such items as the typewritten words on a corner’s report, or a bullet hole in a wall. If the Lieutenant was hit in the face, the camera was made to wobble, This technique may have been used as a cost-cutting device for cash-strapped DuMont, since union rules provided a lower-pay scale for unseen television performers.

When playing the Lieutenant, actor Ken Lynch often had to climb on the sides of the camera, or kneel underneath it for long periods of time. Around his neck was a specially-made hook to hold a microphone, so he could use his hands to hold papers, or a cigar that viewers needed to see through the “eye of the camera.”

Broadcast history
The series was distributed by DuMont, and from October 1949 to May 1950 it aired Wednesdays at 9 pm ET on most DuMont affiliates, on Wednesdays at 9:30 pm ET from May 1950 to May 1951, and Sundays at 9:30 pm ET from June 1951 until September 1954. The last episode of The Plainclothesman aired on September 12, 1954. During the show's Sunday time slot it followed Rocky King Detective, and the two police procedurals were among DuMont's most popular series.

Sponsor 
The Plainclothesman was sponsored by Edgeworth Tobacco, and its tobacco product packages were often visible during episodes.  The sponsor's commercials were done by the series' cast members, who remained in character during the sales pitch. As the trade publication Sponsor noted in an article "... Jack Orrison, who plays Sergeant Brady in the show, is seen exuding satisfaction as he puffs a Harvester Cigar into the face of the audience. Moreover, he shows how cozily the stogy fits into his vest pocket.”

Episode status
Researcher David Weinstein believes only four episodes have been preserved.  One kinescoped episode of the series is held in the J. Fred MacDonald collection at the Library of Congress. One episode can be seen on YouTube.

See also
List of programs broadcast by the DuMont Television Network
List of surviving DuMont Television Network broadcasts

External links
The Plainclothesman episode 

DuMont historical website

References 

1949 American television series debuts
1954 American television series endings
1940s American crime drama television series
1950s American crime drama television series
1940s American police procedural television series
1950s American police procedural television series
Black-and-white American television shows
DuMont Television Network original programming